The Women's 800 metres at the 2015 Asian Athletics Championships was held on the 6 and 7 of June.

Medalists

Records

Schedule

Results

Heat
Qualification rule: The first three finishers in each heat (Q) plus the two fastest times of those who finished fourth or lower in their heat

(q) qualified to final.

Final

References
Results

800
800 metres at the Asian Athletics Championships
2015 in women's athletics